Beyond the Law is a 1934 American crime film directed by D. Ross Lederman.

Cast
 Tim McCoy as Tim Weston
 Shirley Grey as Helen Glenn
 Addison Richards as Morgan
 Harry C. Bradley as Professor
 John Merton as New York Radio Policeman (as Mert La Verre)
 Dick Rush as New York Radio Policeman
 Harold Huber as Gordon
 Mischa Auer as Tully
 Clarence Wilson as Talbot
 Joseph Crehan as Chief Anderson
 Charles C. Wilson as Prosecuting Attorney (as Charles Wilson)
 Reginald Barlow as Judge

References

External links
 

1934 films
1934 crime films
American crime films
1930s English-language films
American black-and-white films
Films directed by D. Ross Lederman
Columbia Pictures films
1930s American films